Darrel Godsil Aschbacher (born June 2, 1935) is a former American football guard who played one season in the National Football League (NFL) for the Philadelphia Eagles and one season in the Canadian Football League (CFL) for the Saskatchewan Roughriders. He also was on the rosters of the San Francisco 49ers and Montreal Alouettes, but did not play.

Early life and education
Aschbacher was born on June 2, 1935, in Prineville, Oregon. He attended Crook County High School near there, and was a member of their 1952 state championship football team. He first played college football for Boise Junior College (now Boise State University), being named all-conference. His coach called him "The kind of a guy that would consider playing in the Rose Bowl the highlight of his life ... he really likes to play. He is one of the most enthusiastic players it has even been my privilege to handle." Aschbacher transferred to University of Oregon in 1957, earning a varsity letter in his first year with the team. As a senior, he helped the team reach the 1958 Rose Bowl, losing to the Ohio State Buckeyes by three points.

Professional career
Aschbacher went unselected in the 1959 NFL Draft, being overlooked by every team. Philadelphia Eagles Hall of Fame quarterback Norm Van Brocklin persuaded the team to give him a tryout, and he made the final roster. Though a team spokesperson said he would be used as a defensive end, he ended up playing the guard position. Overall, in the 1959 season, he appeared in eleven games, starting four while splitting time with Gerry Huth. He wore number 50 with Philadelphia. He re-signed with them in July, but was released early in the 1960 season, missing the team's national championship.

After being released by the Eagles, Aschbacher was signed by the San Francisco 49ers, but was inactive for the entire season. He left the team on August 1, 1961, saying he wanted to return to his home in Prineville, Oregon. Wearing number 61, Aschbacher appeared in twelve games with Saskatchewan.

References

External links
 

1935 births
Living people
Players of American football from Oregon
American football guards
Boise State Broncos football players
Oregon Ducks football players
Philadelphia Eagles players
Saskatchewan Roughriders players
Montreal Alouettes players